The 2001 NCAA Division I women's soccer tournament (also known as the 2001 Women's College Cup) was the 20th annual single-elimination tournament to determine the national champion of NCAA Division I women's collegiate soccer. The semifinals and championship game were played at Southern Methodist University's Gerald J. Ford Stadium in University Park, Texas from December 5–7, 2001.

Santa Clara defeated North Carolina in the final, 1–0, to win their first national title. The Broncos (23–2) were coached by Jerry Smith.

The most outstanding offensive player was Aly Wagner from Santa Clara, and the most outstanding defensive player was Danielle Slaton, also from Santa Clara. Wagner and Slaton, along with nine other players, were named to the All-Tournament team.

The tournament's leading scorer, with 5 goals and 4 assists, was Abby Wambach from Florida.

Qualification

All Division I women's soccer programs were eligible to qualify for the tournament. The tournament field expanded from 48 teams to its current size of 64 teams.

Format
Just as before, the final two rounds, deemed the Women's College Cup, were played at a pre-determined neutral site. All other rounds were played on campus sites at the home field of the higher-seeded team. The only exceptions were the first two rounds, which were played at regional campus sites. The top sixteen teams, only eight of which were actually seeded, hosted four teams at their home fields during the tournament's first weekend.

National seeds
North Carolina
Santa Clara
UCLA
Portland
Stanford
Florida
Notre Dame
Connecticut

Teams

Bracket

Chapel Hill Bracket

Portland Bracket

Los Angeles Bracket

Santa Clara Bracket

College Cup

All-tournament team
Jessica Ballweg, Santa Clara
Jordan Kellgren, North Carolina
Jena Kluegel, North Carolina
Anna Kraus, Santa Clara
Leslie Osborne, Santa Clara
Sara Randolph, North Carolina
Catherine Reddick, North Carolina
Anne Remy, North Carolina
Danielle Slaton, Santa Clara (most outstanding defensive player)
Aly Wagner, Santa Clara (most outstanding offensive player)
Veronica Zepeda, Santa Clara

See also 
 NCAA Women's Soccer Championships (Division II, Division III)
 NCAA Men's Soccer Championships (Division I, Division II, Division III)

References

NCAA
 
NCAA Women's Soccer Championship
NCAA Division I Women's Soccer Tournament
NCAA Division I Women's Soccer Tournament
NCAA Division I Women's Soccer Tournament